Li Shuxian, also known as Li Shu-Hsien (李淑賢; pinyin: Lĭ Shūxían) (4 September 1924 – 9 June 1997), was the fifth and last wife of Puyi, the last emperor of the Qing dynasty in China.

Biography
She was a Han Chinese and a former hospital worker. In 1959, after ten years in prison, Puyi was pardoned. The pair were introduced to one another by a friend in 1962 and wed that same year. Premier Zhou Enlai greeted their marriage. They had no children. She accompanied Puyi to his last days.

After her husband's death, Li retired from public view. Since she was not a regular hospital employee, her life became difficult.

In the early eighties, she sought and received legal ownership of royalties from Puyi's autobiography from the government of China. She later became wealthy by publishing her own memoirs about her final years with Puyi, which she dictated to a scribe. 

Under the approval of the government, she moved Puyi's ashes closer to his ancestors in the Western Qing Tombs (清西陵) from the Babaoshan Revolutionary Cemetery. She died of lung cancer at the age of 72. In her will, she requested that she, Puyi, and Puyi's first concubine Tan Yuling (谭玉龄) be buried together in the cemetery. However, her wishes have thus far not been realized.

References

External links
 Pu Yi's Widow Reveals Last Emperor's Soft Side

1924 births
1997 deaths
Chinese nurses
Han Chinese people
Deaths from lung cancer
Deaths from cancer in the People's Republic of China